Stadio Comunale Bellinzona is a multi-use stadium in Bellinzona, Switzerland.  It is currently used mostly for football matches and is the home stadium of AC Bellinzona.  As of 2009, the stadium has an official capacity of 5,000 people, but could hold up to 20,740. The stadium has 600 seats.

Here is a breakdown of the capacities of each of the five stands of the stadium:

League attendances
Information related to league matches held at the Stadio Comunale by AC Bellinzona in the last 20 years in the tiers of the Swiss Football Association is listed below.

International matches

See also 
List of football stadiums in Switzerland

References

External links

Venue information
City of Bellinzona: stadio communale 
Info at football-lineups.com

Comunale Bellinzona
Sports venues in Ticino
AC Bellinzona
Bellinzona